Juan Carlos Vallejo (born 27 May 1963) is a Spanish former swimmer who competed in the 1980 Summer Olympics and in the 1984 Summer Olympics.

References

1963 births
Living people
Spanish male freestyle swimmers
Olympic swimmers of Spain
Swimmers at the 1980 Summer Olympics
Swimmers at the 1984 Summer Olympics